Sir Frederick William Richards (1869-1957), commonly referred to as F. W. Richards, was an Australian jurist. He retired from the Supreme Court of South Australia as senior puisne Judge in December 1945, having had a long and distinguished career of public service. He had been a Justice of the court since 1927.

Born a son of the Rev. William Richards, an old colonist of the State, Frederick Richards began his education in the public schools of South Australia.

At the age of 14 he went to Shebbear College, Devon, England, which was the alma mater of Sir Samuel Way and the Rev. J. Thome. While there in 1887 he matriculated at London University, where he had an unusually brilliant academic earner, and obtained the degree of LLB. In 1894. A year later he earned the distinction of Doctor of Law at the same university.

Returning to Australia, Frederick Richards spent four years as managing clerk, two in the office of Sir Josiah Symon, and with Messrs. C. C. Kingston and McLachlan. In 1901 he was appointed associate to the then Chief Justice, Sir Samuel Way.

In 1908 he received the appointment of Parliamentary Draftsman and Assistant Crown Solicitor, and in 1916 he was appointed Crown Solicitor. In 1921 he took silk, and in 1925 and 1926 was an acting judge of the Supreme Court of South Australia. He was appointed a Judge in 1927.

He was knighted in 1946.

References

1869 births
1957 deaths
Australian Knights Bachelor
Judges of the Supreme Court of South Australia